San Ildefonso Peninsula is a peninsula in Central Luzon, central part of Luzon island, Philippines, at . It is attached to the mainland through a 3.5 mile wide strip of land. Cape San Ildefonso can be found south of the peninsula.

The peninsula is entirely under the jurisdiction of the municipality of Casiguran, Aurora. The southern half of the peninsula is under Barangay San Ildefonso, the northern tip is under Barangay Culat, while the remainder belongs to Barangay Cozo.

References

Peninsulas of the Philippines
Landforms of Aurora (province)